The Seychelles Tourism Board (STB), a public/private sector body headed by CEO Mrs. Sherin Francis, with Mrs. Kathleen Mason as Chairperson, oversees most aspects of Seychelles' tourism industry whose Minister is Mr. Didier Dogley. The Seychelles Tourism Board is responsible for the promotion and marketing of the Seychelles islands as the preferred tourist destination.

The Seychelles Tourism Board is a statutory body that came into existence on 1 April 2005 when the Seychelles Tourism Board Act, 2005, came into force. The Act brought together all regulatory and monitoring functions of the Department of Tourism within the Ministry of Tourism and Transport, and all promotional and marketing activities of the Seychelles Tourism Marketing Authority.  The Policy Planning and International Co-operation Division was retained under a newly formed Department of Tourism and Transport which fell under the vice-president's office.  The Seychelles Tourism Marketing Authority ceased to exist as legal entity.

However, in 2007 all policy planning and international cooperation functions for tourism in the Department of Tourism and Transport in the vice-president's office and the Seychelles Hospitality and Tourism Training College were transferred to STB.  The SHTTC was then renamed the Seychelles Tourism Academy.  This restructuring brought together all government agencies involved in tourism-related matters under one roof.  The new structure meant the STB could serve and promote the industry more effectively and efficiently.  It also brought better co-ordination and responsiveness with the trade partners to meeting the challenges of the tourism industry.
In 2010 the portfolio for tourism was transferred from the vice-president's to the president's office.  In 2012, a new Ministry of Tourism and Culture was created, however, the functions and roles of Seychelles Tourism Board remained unchanged.

STB Act (Amendment) 

Under the STB Act 2005, STB was administered by a board of at least 12 directors, which was composed of members of the private sector and the government.  It was headed by a chief executive officer for the day-to-day running of the office and administration and execution of decisions of the board of directors.
The act was amended in December 2008 which changed the number of directors from 12 to 7. The amendment also established a Tourism Marketing Fund committee to manage the marketing fund and one committee to oversee the Seychelles Tourism Academy (ex-SHTTC).  The act was amended again in December 2010 to reinstate the post of chief executive and add the promotion of eco-tourism among its statutory functions.

Marketing 

The Marketing Department consists of the following fours sections:

 International Marketing

Responsible for marketing the destination to major source markets and identifying new emerging markets. Marketing activities include excellent Trade Fair presence, Brand Alliance campaigns, PR events, media publications, etc.; also oversees the Seychelles Tourist Offices and representative offices in France, Germany, Italy, United Kingdom, Spain; Abu Dhabi, Dubai, China, South Korea; and South Africa..

 Digital Marketing

The Digital Marketing Section is responsible for spearheading STB's digital marketing strategies, involving the development and management of a dedicated suite of websites, management and monitoring of STBs various social media platforms like Facebook, Twitter, Instagram and the development and implementation of targeted online campaigns on various social media platforms.

 Destination Development

The responsibility of the Destination Development section is to support STB's global marketing efforts in the various markets through the coordination of all local logistics.

 Strategic Planning & Market Intelligence

The Strategic Planning and Market Intelligence section is responsible for enhancing STB's strategic planning capabilities through gathering, processing, monitoring, analyzing and reporting on various forms of market intelligence and data related to the tourism industry.

Corporate Affairs 
The Corporate Affairs Department consists of the following five sections:
 Human Resources and Support Services
The Administration and Human Resource section of the Seychelles Tourism Board provides overall policy direction on human resource management issues and administrative support functions related to the management of the offices of the STB. The section is responsible for ensuring and enhancing the organization's ability in terms of sound organization structure, adequate and competent staffing, tools and equipment to deliver on its mandate.
 Information Technology
The Information Technology Section is responsible for the development and maintenance of IT and telecommunication network infrastructure for the STB.
 Print and Production
The Print and Production is responsible for the production of all collateral materials i.e. hard-copy brochures, manuals, fliers, posters, maps, coffee table books etc. required by the Seychelles Tourism Board in its marketing and information-supplying functions.
 Trade and Visitor Services
The Trade and Visitor Services Section is responsible for providing visitors with adequate and reliable information to ensure their stay in the country is an enjoyable one. This is managed from STB's tourist offices situated in key locations i.e. at the airport and in Victoria on Mahe, at the airport on Praslin and at the jetty on La Digue.
 Finance Section
The Finance Section is responsible for providing support, advisory and centralized services in the field of finance. It ensures the proper monitoring of policies, guidelines and standards as per the Public Finance Management Act and Procurement Act.

Foreign offices 

Seychelles Tourism Board has tourist offices in the United Kingdom, France, Italy, Spain, China and Abu Dhabi, as well as representative offices in South Africa, Mauritius, Middle East, South Korea, India, Germany, Brazil and Russia. These representative offices also handle enquiries for travel, trade and media from the US, Canada and other regions of the world where Seychelles Tourism Board does not have offices or representatives.

Tourism in Seychelles
Tourism agencies